Elyorjon Mamadaliev (born 5 February 1995) is an Uzbekistani sprint canoeist.

He won a medal at the 2019 ICF Canoe Sprint World Championships.

References

1995 births
Living people
ICF Canoe Sprint World Championships medalists in Canadian
Uzbekistani male canoeists
Asian Games medalists in canoeing
Canoeists at the 2018 Asian Games
Asian Games silver medalists for Uzbekistan
Medalists at the 2018 Asian Games
21st-century Uzbekistani people